Autonov 1 is the name given to the automobile novelty that was created sometime in the 1970s, by making a once regular motor vehicle engine able to run in both the forward and backward directions, utilizing all four pre-existing gears in whichever direction.
A second steering wheel was introduced at the back, with a central revolving chair to effect the driver's switch-over position.

Purpose of design 
Its inventor, the late engineering professor Ayodele Awojobi, imagined the advantage of the invention in such a situation as when a motor vehicle drives forward into a cul-de-sac and needs to make a fast, backward retreat. Emergency evacuation procedures or war-time situations exemplify this.

Patent and specification 
A patent for the invention was never obtained before the inventor's untimely death. An abandoned Layland jeep was utilized for the invention and it is to this day, displayed at the Faculty of Engineering, University of Lagos during the said faculty's "Engineering week". It basically consists of a jeep, with a second steering wheel built-in at the rear end that connects the axle. A gear-shift is also built here that connects, through a built-in mechanism, to the already pre-existing four gears, such that the hybrid vehicle can be driven on all four gears, in both forward and backward directions. The jeep's central compartment was re-designed to have a rotating floor mechanism that can swivel an occupant from the rear seat, to the front one and vice versa.

Short of dismantling it piece-meal, the detailed knowledge of the designed mechanism is unknown as no drawings or design sketches are known to exist.

References 

Automobile transmissions
Cars of Nigeria
Nigerian inventions